A spinning top is a type of toy.

Spinning top may also refer to:

 Spinning top (candlestick pattern), a Japanese candlestick pattern
 The Spinning Top, a 2009 album by Graham Coxon
 The Spinning Topps, characters in Sliders
 "Spinning Top", a song by Nazareth, a B-side of the 1973 single "Bad Bad Boy"
 "Spinning Top", a song by XTC from White Music
 A nickname for FC Schalke 04's style of play in the 1930s and 1940s
 Spinning Top, a 2019 album by Got7